Ricardo Feller (born 1 June 2000) is a Swiss racing driver who currently competes in the ADAC GT Masters and GT World Challenge Europe.

Career

Early career
Feller began karting in 2011, competing in the Supermini class of the Switzerland-based Bridgestone Cup. The following year, he expanded his karting program, taking second overall in the Supermini class of the 2012 Swiss Karting Championship. In 2016, at the age of 15, Feller stepped into single-seater formula cars for the first time in his career, joining Mücke Motorsport (branded as ADAC Berlin-Brandenburg) for the 2016 ADAC Formula 4 Championship season.

Sports car racing
For 2017, Feller made the transition to sports car racing, competing in the 2017 ADAC GT Masters alongside teammate Mikaela Åhlin-Kottulinsky with the new-for-2017 Audi Sport Racing Academy team. With his appearance in the opening round, Feller became the youngest driver in series history. Although the duo failed to score a point in 2017, Feller rejoined Mücke Motorsport for the 2018 season, sharing his Audi R8 LMS with Audi factory driver Christopher Haase. Later that year, Feller made his debut in the GT World Challenge Europe, taking part in the Sprint Cup for Belgian Audi Club Team WRT. He and co-driver Adrien de Leener would score their first and only victory of the season at the Nürburgring in September.

To begin 2019, Feller made his debut at the 24 Hours of Daytona, driving for Land Motorsport. This opportunity grew into a full Michelin Endurance Cup campaign for himself and co-drivers Christopher Mies and Daniel Morad. They recorded a best finish of second in the season finale at Road Atlanta. Later that year, Feller scored his first race victory in the ADAC GT Masters at Zandvoort. For 2020, Feller joined Emil Frey Racing, competing in the Pro class of the GT World Challenge Europe Endurance Cup.

After competing with Mücke Motorsport during the 2020 season, Feller returned to Land Motorsport for the 2021 ADAC GT Masters season. Reunited with co-driver Mies, the two claimed three race victories en route to the overall championship, with Feller also taking the Junior categorization title as well. With Emil Frey Racing, Feller scored the 2021 GT World Challenge Europe Endurance Cup Silver class title, driving alongside Alex Fontana and Rolf Ineichen. The trio scored two class victories and three podiums from five races en route to their title.

For 2022, Feller joined Audi Sport's factory roster, taking part in the DTM with Team Abt Sportsline. He had reportedly received multiple offers ahead of the 2022 season, but elected to sign a factory contract with Audi. At Imola in June, he claimed his first career DTM pole. He would go on to win that race, in the process scoring his first series victory. Feller would score one additional podium in 2022, finishing 15th in the championship. Following his rookie season, Feller stated he was pleased with the year, and believed that the team had potential in the near future to challenge more frequently for race victories. Outside of his DTM commitments, Feller competed part-time in the ADAC GT Masters, driving for Land-Motorsport alongside Jusuf Owega when DTM and GT Masters dates didn't clash. His Audi factory driver duties also saw him take part in several one-off endurance events, including the Bathurst 12 Hour with The Bend Motorsport Park Team Valvoline, the 24 Hours of Spa with Attempto Racing, and the 24 Hours of Nürburgring with Team Phoenix. For the final round of the 2022 GT World Challenge Europe Endurance Cup, he deputized for Team WRT's Kelvin van der Linde, who was unwell.

Feller began his 2023 campaign at the Bathurst 12 Hour, finishing second in the Pro-Am class where he shared his Audi with Yasser Shahin and Christopher Mies. He returned to his factory driver duties at the Kyalami 9 Hours, where he finished third overall alongside co-drivers Mattia Drudi and Patric Niederhauser. His partnership with Drudi continued throughout the 2023 season, where the two shared Tresor Orange1's Audi for the full GT World Challenge Europe campaign. Fellow factory driver Dennis Marschall joined the entry for the Endurance Cup. In late February, Feller's return to DTM for a second season was confirmed, where he would again drive for Abt Sportsline.

Racing record

Career summary

Complete GT World Challenge Europe results

GT World Challenge Europe Endurance Cup

GT World Challenge Europe Sprint Cup

Complete IMSA SportsCar Championship results
(key) (Races in bold indicate pole position)

Complete Deutsche Tourenwagen Masters results
(key) (Races in bold indicate pole position) (Races in italics indicate fastest lap)

References

External links
Ricardo Feller at Motorsport.com
Ricardo Feller at W Racing Team

2000 births
Living people
Swiss racing drivers
ADAC Formula 4 drivers
Italian F4 Championship drivers
ADAC GT Masters drivers
Blancpain Endurance Series drivers
WeatherTech SportsCar Championship drivers
24 Hours of Daytona drivers
People from Aarau
Sportspeople from Aargau
Audi Sport drivers
Nürburgring 24 Hours drivers
Deutsche Tourenwagen Masters drivers
W Racing Team drivers
Mücke Motorsport drivers
Emil Frey Racing drivers
Abt Sportsline drivers
Phoenix Racing drivers
Saintéloc Racing drivers
Lamborghini Squadra Corse drivers
24H Series drivers